Meiners Oaks is an unincorporated community lying west of the city of Ojai in Ventura County, California, United States. The population was 3,571 at the 2010 census. For statistical purposes, the United States Census Bureau has defined Meiners Oaks as a census-designated place (CDP).

History
German native John Meiners had immigrated to America in 1848 and established a successful brewing operation in Milwaukee. In the 1870s, he acquired the land that would become Meiners Oaks as payment for a debt. When a friend and business associate, Edward D. Holton, travelled through California and investigated the land, Meiners learned that he had acquired one of the largest oak groves on flat ground in southern California. Upon arriving in person, Meiners also found the climate agreeable, and established a ranch. Several hundred acres, north of the oak grove, were used quite successfully to grow lemons, oranges, plums, apricots and apples, as well as oats, wheat, barley and more. Meiners lived on his ranch intermittently until his death in 1898.

Geography
Meiners Oaks is in the mid-northern section of the Ojai Valley, and is bordered by the community of Mira Monte to the south, and the City of Ojai to the east. Meiners Oaks is in the heart of the Ojai Valley, very close to the Ventura River, where there are several hiking trails.

The census bureau definition of the area as a CDP may not precisely correspond to local understanding of the area with the same name.

Climate
The climate of Meiners Oaks is Mediterranean, characterized by hot, dry summers, at times exceeding , and mild, rainy winters, with lows at night falling below freezing at times. During dry spells with continental air, morning temperatures, due to Ojai's valley location, can drop well below most of Southern California, with the record being  on January 6 and 7 of 1913.

Typically for much of coastal southern California, most precipitation falls in the form of rain between the months of October and April, with intervening dry summers. During the wettest month on record of January 1969,  fell, with a whopping  in eight days from January 19 to January 26.

Demographics

2010
At the 2010 census Meiners Oaks had a population of 3,571. This reflects a decrease in population of 4.8%, as compared with the 2000 census (not a difference of "one person" as noted above). The racial makeup of Meiners Oaks was 2,789 (78.1%) White, 14 (0.4%) African American, 58 (1.6%) Native American, 51 (1.4%) Asian, 1 (0.0%) Pacific Islander, 549 (15.4%) from other races, and 109 (3.1%) from two or more races. Hispanic or Latino of any race were 1,068 persons (29.9%).

The census reported that 3,565 people (99.8% of the population) lived in households, 6 (0.2%) lived in non-institutionalized group quarters, and no one was institutionalized.

There were 1,283 households, 460 (35.9%) had children under the age of 18 living in them, 607 (47.3%) were opposite-sex married couples living together, 178 (13.9%) had a female householder with no husband present, 81 (6.3%) had a male householder with no wife present.  There were 101 (7.9%) unmarried opposite-sex partnerships, and 11 (0.9%) same-sex married couples or partnerships. 311 households (24.2%) were one person and 130 (10.1%) had someone living alone who was 65 or older. The average household size was 2.78.  There were 866 families (67.5% of households); the average family size was 3.24.

The age distribution was 851 people (23.8%) under the age of 18, 300 people (8.4%) aged 18 to 24, 845 people (23.7%) aged 25 to 44, 1,116 people (31.3%) aged 45 to 64, and 459 people (12.9%) who were 65 or older.  The median age was 40.2 years. For every 100 females, there were 92.4 males.  For every 100 females age 18 and over, there were 91.4 males.

There were 1,396 housing units at an average density of 991.3 per square mile, of the occupied units 798 (62.2%) were owner-occupied and 485 (37.8%) were rented. The homeowner vacancy rate was 1.1%; the rental vacancy rate was 6.7%.  2,200 people (61.6% of the population) lived in owner-occupied housing units and 1,365 people (38.2%) lived in rental housing units.

2000
At the 2000 census there were 3,750 people, 1,288 households, and 941 families in the CDP. The racial makeup of the CDP was 83.12% White, 0.43% African American, 1.09% Native American, 0.91% Asian, 0.08% Pacific Islander, 10.77% from other races, and 3.60% from two or more races. Hispanic or Latino of any race were 23.09%.

Of the 1,288 households 42.2% had children under the age of 18 living with them, 53.0% were married couples living together, 14.6% had a female householder with no husband present, and 26.9% were non-families. 21.0% of households were one person and 7.7% were one person aged 65 or older.  The average household size was 2.90 and the average family size was 3.32.

The age distribution was 29.9% under the age of 18, 8.0% from 18 to 24, 28.4% from 25 to 44, 23.5% from 45 to 64, and 10.2% 65 or older.  The median age was 36 years. For every 100 females, there were 97.3 males.  For every 100 females age 18 and over, there were 93.7 males.

The median household income was $51,811 and the median family income  was $56,778. Males had a median income of $49,083 versus $28,839 for females. The per capita income for the CDP was $23,152.  About 8.1% of families and 11.9% of the population were below the poverty line, including 17.3% of those under age 18 and 6.6% of those age 65 or over.

Education

Schools in Meiners Oaks are served by the Ojai Unified School District, including Meiners Oaks Elementary School.  There are also several private schools located in Meiners Oaks.

Libraries
Public Libraries: Ventura County Library - 14 locations with three branches in the Ojai Valley: Meiners Oaks Library, Ojai Library, and Oak View Library.

References

See also
Oak Grove School (Ojai, California)
Nordhoff High School

Census-designated places in Ventura County, California
Census-designated places in California